Chris Fowler (born ) is an American sports broadcaster for ESPN, who serves as the  play-by-play  announcer for Saturday Night Football on ABC and ESPN’s tennis coverage. He is also known for his work on College GameDay, which he hosted between 1990 and 2014, and for college football.

In 2014, he replaced Brent Musburger as the play-by-play announcer for Saturday Night Football on ABC, having him on ESPN's top announcing team alongside fellow College Gameday's Kirk Herbstreit; this meant he would also be selected to announce one of the two College Football Playoff semifinal games and the College Football National Championship.

Early life and education
Fowler grew up in Rockford, Illinois and State College, Pennsylvania where his father, Knox, was a theater professor at Penn State University. When he was a teenager, his family moved back to Colorado and he graduated from General William J. Palmer High School in Colorado Springs in 1980.

Fowler graduated from the University of Colorado in 1985 with a Bachelor of Science degree. While a student, Fowler served as a producer and co-host for a weekly magazine program aired over a cable television system in Boulder, Colorado from 1983 to 1985. He also spent two years as sports director at KAIR-AM, the university's radio station. From 1982 to 1984, he covered high school sports for the Rocky Mountain News.

Career

Prior to joining ESPN, Fowler spent nearly two years at KCNC-TV, then the NBC affiliate in Denver, as a production assistant, a producer/writer and as a sports reporter. In 1984, he worked for several months at KMGH-TV in the same city as an intern in the sports department.

Fowler joined ESPN in July 1986 as the host/reporter of Scholastic Sports America, a stint which lasted two years. In 1988, he began serving as a college football sideline reporter for two seasons. While on the college football beat, Fowler conducted an exclusive interview with former star University of Oklahoma quarterback Charles Thompson, who was in prison at the time on drug charges.

He began as host of the College GameDay football road show in 1990 and expanded to ESPN's other Saturday college football segments in 1991.

After Charles Woodson won the 1997 Heisman Trophy over Tennessee's Peyton Manning, Tennessee fans blamed ESPN and in particular, Fowler, who had emceed the award ceremony and handed the trophy to Woodson. Fowler received abuse from Tennessee fans (and he described the reaction as "trailer park frenzy" on a radio show), and GameDay avoided shooting on the Tennessee campus for several years that followed.

In February 2015, ESPN announced Rece Davis will take over for Fowler as host of GameDay, but that Fowler will continue his play-by-play role on Saturday Night Football on ABC and College Football Playoff games, and as host of the annual Heisman Trophy presentations.

Until 2006, he was also the lead studio host of College Basketball on ESPN.  Fowler has also worked with ESPN's Summer X Games from 1995 to 2000 and the Winter X Games from 1998 to 2000 as well as horse racing broadcasts, including the Breeders Cup World Thoroughbred Championship on ESPN. In addition, he serves as the head play-by-play for tennis tournaments broadcast on ESPN, including Wimbledon, Australian Open, French Open and for the US Open being broadcast for the first year in 2009 on ESPN.  In 2010, he anchored, along with Mike Tirico, ESPN's and ABC's month-long coverage of the 2010 FIFA World Cup. In 2020, Fowler announced the first game of the Monday Night Football Kickoff Week doubleheader alongside Kirk Herbstreit.

He is also the host of the ESPN Classic show SportsCentury.

He was the host of the Seattle Kraken's expansion draft coverage which was the first ESPN hockey event with the NHL since 2004. During the telecast he would make an regrettable error in calling the Carolina Hurricanes the “Carolina Panthers”. This led to both teams Twitter accounts switching logos mocking him.

Along with fellow College Gameday hosts Lee Corso and Desmond Howard, in 2007 Fowler broadcast College Gameday from Williams College for its homecoming game against Amherst College, the first and only time College Gameday has covered a Division III game. Fowler has called the experience, and Williams' tradition of "The Walk" up Spring Street following a victory over Amherst, "one of the best traditions in college football." Fowler joined the Williams football players in St. Pierre barbershop following the game to celebrate Williams' victory.

Personal life
Fowler is married to former fitness model/instructor Jennifer Dempster, who appeared on ESPN in the 1990s on the show BodyShaping.

References

External links
 
 Chris Fowler ESPN Bio

Living people
American horse racing announcers
American soccer commentators
American television sports announcers
College basketball announcers in the United States
College football announcers
ESPN people
Tennis commentators
University of Colorado alumni
University of Colorado Boulder alumni
Year of birth missing (living people)